John Franklin West  (1873–1932) was a Major League Baseball pitcher who pitched in one game for the Boston Beaneaters in . He threw three innings of relief, giving up three runs on five hits and two walks, striking out one batter.

Sources

Major League Baseball pitchers
Boston Beaneaters players
Lebanon Pretzel Eaters players
Johnstown Pirates players
Johnstown Terrors players
York White Roses players
Brockton Shoemakers players
Altoona Mad Turtles players
Lancaster Chicks players
Lancaster Maroons players
Allentown Peanuts players
Baseball players from Pennsylvania
1873 births
1932 deaths
19th-century baseball players
Sportspeople from Johnstown, Pennsylvania